The Yukon Federation of Labour (YFL) is the Yukon trade union federation of labour chartered by the Canadian Labour Congress (CLC). Although the Yukon is not, strictly speaking, a province, the CLC has recognized the YFL as a provincial federation of labour with the same standing as those of the ten Canadian provinces.

The YFL was founded in 1980 and has a membership of over 5000.

External links
 www.yukonfed.com

Canadian Labour Congress
Provincial federations of labour (Canada)
Trade unions established in 1980